The Perivoli Schools Trust was established in 2012 and operates a nursery school teacher training programme in countries across sub-Saharan Africa. They include Namibia, Malawi, Zambia, Uganda and Botswana.

History

The Perivoli Schools Trust was established by the Perivoli Trust and funded by the Perivoli Foundation. Perivoli Foundation is funded by the Perivoli Trust and also by Perivoli Innovations, a technology venture fund. The Perivoli Trust was settled by James Alexandroff. James was awarded an OBE in the New Year Honours 2023 Overseas and International List for his services to Education in Africa. He co-founded Singapore-based emerging markets investment management firm Arisaig Partners in 1996 and donated his one third share to the Perivoli Trust in 1999.

Maya Kafuwa and her husband Titan Madomba are the current joint CEOs of the Perivoli Schools Trust.

Activities
The programme shows nursery school teachers the importance of play and how to make games and educational activities out of recyclable waste materials, such as yoghurt cartons, bottle tops, toilet rolls, pieces of cardboard, discarded garments and tin cans

More than 13,000 nursery school teachers have received training through the work of the trust, reaching more than 320,000 children. Perivoli Schools Trust set targets of training more than 200,000 teachers and five million children.

Awards
In 2022, Perivoli Schools Trust was awarded a bronze level award in the Educational Excellence category at the 2022 Global Good Awards. The programme also won an International Green Apple Environment Award and was shortlisted for Project of the Year award at the 2022 Business Charity Awards.

References

Educational projects